The British Association of Urological Surgeons is a professional association in the United Kingdom for urology professionals. 

Its official journal is the BJU International, established in 1929, which is also the journal of the Urological Society of Australia and New Zealand, the Irish Society of Urology, the Caribbean Urological Association, the Hong Kong Urological Society, and the Swiss Continence Foundation; and the "affiliated journal" of the Urological Society of India, the Indonesian Urological Association and the Investigative and Clinical Urology journal.

Its website carries public data about how many prostatectomies and other procedures each surgeon carries out, so that patients can make informed decisions if they wish to choose a surgeon.

It awards honorary membership, awards and medals to people who have made an outstanding contribution to the field.

It is involved in the discussions of guidance for surgeons in the United Kingdom. 

In 2022 it inaugurated the Silver Ureteroscope Award, which went to Gareth Jones, an Endourological surgeon with NHS Greater Glasgow and Clyde.

Its website hosts a Virtual Museum with a history of Urology going back to  3200BC and A Brief History of The Flush Toilet.

References

Medical associations based in the United Kingdom
Urology organizations